La era de la boludez [Age of stupidity] is a studio album released in 1993 by Argentine rock band Divididos. It contains a lot of the most famous songs by the group, as "El arriero" (original by Atahualpa Yupanqui), "¿Qué ves?" and "Salir a comprar". It is the best-selling album of Divididos, selling over 480,000 copies.

In 2007, the Argentine edition of Rolling Stone ranked it seventh on its list of "The 100 Greatest Albums of National Rock".

Track listing 

 [Go Out To Scare]
Ortega y Gases [Wordplay on Spanish philosopher Ortega y Gasset's last name and the word gases (farts)]
El Arriero (original by Atahualpa Yupanqui) [The Muleteer]
Salir a Comprar [Go Out To Buy]
¿Qué Ves? [What Do You See?]
Pestaña de Camello [Camel Eyelash]
Rasputín/Hey Jude
Dame un Limón [Give Me A Lemon]
Paisano de Hurlingham [Hurlingham Dude]
Cristófolo Cacarnú
Indio Dejá el Mezcal [Indian, quit consuming mezcal]
Huelga de Amores [Loves On Strike]
Tajo C [literally: Slash C, but it sounds as a colloquial way of asking Is José there?]
Pestaña de Camello [Camel Eyelash]

References

1993 albums
Divididos albums
PolyGram albums
Albums produced by Gustavo Santaolalla